Arytera littoralis is a species of plant in the family Sapindaceae. It native to China and Southeast Asia.

References

littoralis
Flora of China
Flora of tropical Asia
Taxonomy articles created by Polbot
Taxobox binomials not recognized by IUCN